Thierry Havet (born 13 February 1952) is a French field hockey player. He competed in the men's tournament at the 1972 Summer Olympics.

References

External links
 

1952 births
Living people
French male field hockey players
Olympic field hockey players of France
Field hockey players at the 1972 Summer Olympics
Place of birth missing (living people)
20th-century French people